Llamachayuq (Quechua llama llama, -cha, -yuq suffixes, "with a little llama (or llamas)", also spelled Llamachayoq) is an archaeological complex with petroglyphs in Peru. It is located in the Apurímac Region, Andahuaylas Province, San Jerónimo District.

References 

Archaeological sites in Peru
Archaeological sites in Apurímac Region
Rock art in South America